Tagore International School is a private international school in New Delhi, India. Named after Rabindranath Tagore, it envisions an education "deeply rooted in one’s immediate surroundings but connected to the cultures of the wider world, predicated upon pleasurable learning and individualized to the personality of the child". The school is run by the Tagore Education Society, a society founded by Dr. Mrs. Hari Sen and Mr. Jitender Sen in 1964. Tagore International School is present in two locations viz. East Of Kailash and Vasant Vihar

History 
Tagore International School was established in 1972 by Dr. Hj Sen . com, as an English medium Senior Secondary School.

School emblem 
The Tagorean emblem represents three letters T I S. The central I is the leaping flame of the candle, signifying everlasting knowledge, enclosed by T which forms the arms and legs of the child who is never tired in his quest for this 'Vidya' or knowledge. Like the light of the candle, the child is continuously striving to reach for the stars. Also, the school pledge is Aham Yogya Asmi, which has been drafted with an objective to instill confidence and forward-looking approach in the students.

Gallery
Tagore International School, in the Eastern part of Kailash hosts annual inter-school art, oratory and technology festival every year. In 2019, this fest was titled TAGFEST-2019.

References

External links 
 

International schools in Delhi
Memorials to Rabindranath Tagore